Hamdi Akın (born 17 August 1954, in Istanbul) is a Turkish businessman, chairman of the board of directors of Akfen Holding. In 2016, Forbes ranked him #1694 of the world's fortunes with a net worth of $1 billion, and the 27th fortune in Turkey.

Early life 
Hamdi Akin is the third child of Hasan and Hikmet Akın. He studied high school in Mustafa Kemal Lisesi in Ankara, Yenimahalle, and then mechanical engineering in Gazi University.

Professional life 
Hamdi Akin got a start in business while he was in his third year of university and manufactured water storage, fuel storage and heating boiler in his father's workshop. Akin’s first commission was to manufacture the heating boiler of Ankara Emek Camii (Mosque).  Later on, he opened up a shop for construction goods in Ankara, on Rüzgarlı Street. In 1976, he became a contractor in the construction business and founded Akfen Holding. In the 1980s, he mainly dealt with infrastructure projects, besides hospitals and school buildings construction. In 1986, he developed his first public infrastructure investment project, the Antalya Airport Terminal Building, which came to life with the ‘Build – Operate – Transfer’ model. He also contracted the Kayseri Erkilet Airport, the Çarşamba Airport, the Isparta Airport, the General Directorate of State Airports Authority and Bursa Natural Gas.

In 1997, he founded “TAV Airports” with TEPE Group and VIE Group and won the İstanbul Atatürk Airport tender, which was constructed with the ‘Build – Operate – Transfer’ model. He gathered all the companies that mainly serve to design and develop real estate investment projects of airport, construction, port investment and management, as well as energy and other infrastructure investments, under a single Holding roof. He is the chairman of board of directors in Akfen Holding as well as TAV Airports Holding since 2005.

In 2005, Hamdi Akin went into a 50/50 partnership with one of the prominent port operators, PSA, and won the tender for privatization of Mersin Port’s 36 years of operational rights. In 2006, he founded Akfen Real Estate Investment Trust Inc. He made a deal with Accor S.A. to form a strategic partnership and build three and four starred city hotels. In 2007, he set Mersin International Port (MIP) into operation and became the chairman of the board of directors. Akfen won the operational rights to operate the vehicle inspection stations with TUV Sud AG and Dogus Automotive for 20 years, and sold its share to Bridge Point in 2009.

In 2005, he founded Akfen Su Inc. with the partnership of Kardan N.V. In 2011, he won the tender for the privatization of "İDO" (Istanbul Fast Ferries Co. Inc.) with Tepe Construction, Souter Investments LLP and Sera Real Estate and Operations Inc. IN 2012, he sold 38% of his shares in TVA Airports to Aéroports de Paris for $847 million.

Social Responsibilities 
Hamdi Akin founded TİKAV (Turkey Human Resources Foundation) in 1999 for the students of Fırat University, to provide the social education necessary for their personal development during their 4 years of university education. He is the honorary head of the Foundation. He is also one of the founders of the Contemporary Turkey Studies Chair at the London School of Economics.

In December 2015, following the Syrian civil war, Hamdi Akin opened his homes to Syrian refugees.

Non-governmental organizations 
 Vice president of Fenerbahçe Sports Club (2000–2002) 
 MESS – Council of the Turkish Metal Industrialists' Union, Ankara Region Representative (1992–2004) 
 TÜGİAD – president of Turkish Young Businessmen’s Association (1998–2000) 
 TİSK – board Member of Turkish Confederation of Employer Associations (1995–2001) 
 TÜSİAD – Turkish Industrialists’ and Businessmen’s Association, member of the board and president of Information Society and New Technologies Commission (2008–2009) 
 TÜSİAD – Turkish Industrialists’ and Businessmen’s Association, member 
 Foundation to Support Kayseri AGÜ – board of trustees, vice president
 Deniz Temiz Foundation – member of the Board
 İstanbul Rotary Club – member

Private life 
Hamdi Akin has two daughters and a son. Pelin Akin and Selim Akin are members of the board of Afken Holding.

References

External links
Akfen Holding Website
Akfen REIT Website
Creating Emerging Markets Interview at the Harvard Business School

1954 births
Living people
Turkish businesspeople
Turkish billionaires